Everyone Poops is the title of US editions of the English translation (by Amanda Mayer Stinchecum) of , a Japanese children's book written and illustrated by the prolific children's author Tarō Gomi and first published in Japan by Fukuinkan Shoten in 1977 within the series .

The English translation has been published in the US by Kane/Miller, within the series "My Body Science", and by Scholastic. In Britain, the book is titled Everybody Poos and is published by Frances Lincoln.

The book tells children that all animals defecate and that they have always done so. The book is intended to relieve shame and embarrassment around the act of defecating by explaining to children that it is a natural part of life.

The book has also been translated into Spanish and Thai.

Story
Everyone Poops does not have a plot. The first sixteen pages contain various prompts regarding defecation in animals such as opposites ("An elephant makes a big poop" and "[a] mouse makes a tiny poop"), comparisons (that various species produce various sizes and shapes of poop) and questions ("What does whale poop look like?").

On the seventeenth page, a boy with black overalls and a red shirt is introduced, seen running into a bathroom. The book then goes on to explain how people of all ages, from adults to very young children, defecate, and how infants may use diapers. After that, there are only three more illustrations that do not feature the boy. On the next page of the book, the child uses toilet paper and flushes the toilet. The final portion of the book explains that because every animal eats, they must therefore defecate, and the book ends with rear views of the boy and six different animals defecating and the words "Everyone Poops".

Publication
Everyone Poops was written by Tarō Gomi, and first published by Tokyo-based Fukuinkan Shoten as Minna Unchi in 1977.

It was acquired by Kane/Miller in 1993. Kane/Miller was later bought by Educational Development Corporation. Everyone Poops is the best-known title sold by the company. This book is sold in the U.S. through traditional bookstores such as Barnes & Noble and on the party plan by independent booksellers.

Editions
 Minna Unchi. Kagaku no Tomo Kessaku-shū. Tokyo: Fukuinkan Shoten, 1977. For later printings, . 28 pages in Japanese edition.
 Everyone Poops. Trans. Amanda Mayer Stinchecum. My Body Science. Brooklyn, N.Y.: Kane/Miller, 1993. .
 Everyone Poops. Trans. Amanda Mayer Stinchecum. La Jolla: Kane/Miller, 2001. . New York: Scholastic, 2004. .
 Everybody Poos. Trans. Amanda Mayer Stinchecum. London: Frances Lincoln, 2002. . London: Frances Lincoln, 2004. 
 Todos hacemos caca. Trans: Leopoldo Iribarren. Brooklyn, N.Y.: Kane/Miller, 1997. 
 ʻƯ. Krung Thēp: Samnakphim Phrǣo Phư̄an Dek, 1995. . Krungthēp: ʻAmmarin, 2003. .

See also

Toilet training
The Gas We Pass
What's Your Poo Telling You?
The Story of the Little Mole Who Knew It Was None of His Business

References

1977 children's books
Japanese books
Japanese picture books
Books about feces
Books about toilet training